The coat of arms of the Prince of Wales is the official heraldic insignia of the Prince of Wales, a title traditionally granted to the heir apparent of the reigning monarch of the United Kingdom of Great Britain and Northern Ireland, formerly the Kingdom of Great Britain and before that the Kingdom of England. 

The coat of arms devised for Charles III, then Prince of Wales, in 1958,  were the same as his granduncle, Edward VIII, had used as prince of Wales since 1911 (see below for references), and contained the badges and elements taken from all four of the constituent countries of the United Kingdom as well as from the many titles the prince holds as heir apparent. These arms lapsed when Charles became king.

William, Prince of Wales currently uses the arms with the plain white label of an heir apparent without the additional badges and elements used by his father and previous generations to denote the title of prince of Wales. Since Edward I awarded it to his son the future Edward II, the heir apparent to the English throne has been created with the title Prince of Wales. William was so created by Charles III on the 2nd day of his reign. The English College of Arms has yet to assign William, and Charles III has yet to settle on William by royal warrant, a version of the royal arms that depicts elements of his title as prince of Wales.

The history of the coat of arms is closely linked with those of the Royal coat of arms of England and the Royal coat of arms of the United Kingdom. However, as the noted antiquarian and heraldist Charles Boutell wrote in 1863, "The Arms of the Prince of Wales have a distinct individuality of their own, with which nothing ought to be directly associated".

Elements typically included

Coronet 

The coronets of the Prince and the Peers of the realm were regulated by Charles II by Royal Warrant, signed on 9 February 1661. Part of the warrant proclaimed: "Our Will and Pleasure therefore is, That the Son and Heir Apparent of the Crown for the time being, shall use and bear his Coronet composed of Crosses and Flower-de-Lized with one Arch; and in the midst a Ball and Cross, as hath our Royal Diadem".

In other words, the heraldic coronet used in the Prince of Wales's coat of arms is similar to the heraldic crown used in the Royal arms, except that instead of two intersecting arches it has only one. Boutell wrote that: "It should be noticed, however, that this coronet belongs to the prince as eldest son of the Sovereign and heir-apparent to the Throne, and not as Prince of Wales". The coronet is also used by the Prince of Wales's consort, in her coat of arms.

The heir's coronet was confirmed in another Royal Warrant signed on 19 November 1917 by George V. The warrant proclaimed: "by the son and heir apparent of the sovereign and his successors a coronet composed of crosses and fleurs-de-lis with one arch and in the midst a ball and cross as in the royal crown."

Currently there are three physical examples of coronets used at one time or other as part of the Honours of the Principality of Wales: the Coronet of Frederick, the Coronet of George and the Coronet of Charles. However, these physical manifestations have not affected the graphical representation of the coronet in heraldic art.

Label 
Beginning with the reign of Edward I, a label of three points Azure (or blue) was used by his son, the future Edward II, to differentiate his arms from those of his father. Without such a label their arms would be identical. Within heraldry this system of differentiating arms is called cadency. The label is placed on the chief (or top) of the shield of arms, with the ends extending across from the dexter to the sinister sides of the shield. It was Edward the Black Prince, heir of Edward III, who first used a label of three points Argent, also white or silver. This has been the label of the heir apparent ever since, without regard to the system of cadency used by other members of the royal family.

Crest 
The Prince of Wales's crest follows closely that of the Sovereign, but always with the appropriate label of difference displayed. This crest depicts a "Lion Or, passant guardant, wearing a coronet of the Heir, and differenced on the shoulders with a label of three points Argent." The lion always stands on a larger coronet of the Heir, which then sits on a golden helmet or the Royal Helm. From the sides flow the gold and ermine mantling of the royal family.

Supporters 
Similarly to the crest, the prince's supporters follow those of the Sovereign. On either side of the shield of arms and standing on gold scrollwork are the royal supporters: the Lion and the Unicorn. Both beasts have the prince's label charged around their necks, again as an appropriate mark of difference. The lion on the dexter side, an ancient symbol of England, is crowned with the coronet of the Heir. The beast has been a supporter of the English royal arms since the reign of Henry VIII. The white unicorn of Scotland on the sinister side was incorporated into the royal arms from the Scottish royal arms after the Union of the crowns in 1603.

Order 
Prince Charles was appointed a Knight of the Garter in 1958. Since the founding of the Order in 1348, almost every Prince of Wales has been appointed to the Order. The Order of the Garter is represented in the coat of arms by its namesake the blue buckled garter, which bears in gold letters the motto Honi soit qui mal y pense, middle French for "Shame on him who thinks evil of it".

Motto 
Under the coat of arms is a scroll bearing the motto Ich dien, German for "I serve". The motto of uncertain origin first appeared on the arms of Edward of Woodstock ('The Black Prince'). Prince Edward was created Prince of Wales by his father Edward III on 12 May 1343. Legend holds that the Black Prince took the motto as well as the ostrich feathers from John the Blind of Bohemia, who was killed fighting alongside the prince and his father at the Battle of Crécy in 1346. The motto is also a near homophone for Eich Dyn, "Your Man" in Welsh.

Badges
The Prince of Wales as part of his full achievement of arms has many Heraldic badges, which represent the history and sovereignty of his many titles.

Prince of Wales' feathers

 
The Prince of Wales's feathers badge comprises "a plume of three ostrich feathers Argent enfiled by a royal coronet of alternate crosses and fleur-de-lys Or" with the motto "Ich Dien" on a dark blue ribbon. The badge is probably the most recognisable element of the Prince of Wales's heraldic achievement as a personal insignia of the prince and also of the Principality of Wales itself. In a personal capacity the badge is granted as a Royal Warrant of Appointment to companies that regularly supply goods and services to the Prince. Currently there are 170 companies which are entitled to display this badge with the words "By Appointment to HRH The Prince of Wales" underneath. The badge can be depicted on all premises, delivery vehicles, stationery and advertisements as well as on the individual products themselves. Other organisations associated with Wales or the Prince incorporate the badge into their own insignia including many Welsh regiments of the British Army (such as the Royal Regiment of Wales) and the Welsh Rugby Union.

Feathers used as either a crest or a badge have been an ancient heraldic badge of the House of Plantagenet. However, it was not until its incorporation into the heraldic achievements of the Black Prince that the feathers have become an omnipresent feature of the coats of arms of the Prince of Wales.

Red Dragon of Wales

On 10 December 1901 a warrant signed by Edward VII approved the addition of a badge of the Red Dragon to the coat of arms of the Prince of Wales. The proclamation specified "on the sinister side a representation of the Badge of Wales, namely, on a mount vert a Dragon, passant gules, differenced (as in the Crest) with a label of three points argent." This was to complement the feathers badge, which was to be depicted on the dexter side of the prince's crest.

The Red Dragon, or Y Ddraig Goch, has been a symbol associated with Wales since the time of Cadwaladr, King of Gwynedd in the 7th century. It was not until the beginning of the House of Tudor that the Red Dragon became a royal badge of the kings of England. Henry Tudor (later King Henry VII) displayed the Dragon of Cadwaladr on his battle standard. The red dragon became an official royal badge of the sovereign (representing Wales) according to a warrant issued in 1801. The warrant at the same time also confirmed the Tudor rose as a royal badge for England, the thistle for Scotland and the golden harp for Ireland.

Arms of the Duchy of Cornwall

The arms of the Duke of Cornwall are: "Sable, fifteen bezants, five, four, three, two and one." These arms were derived from those of Richard of Cornwall, King of the Romans, son and heir of King John, who was also Count of Poitiers (or Poitou), represented by arms made up of peas or gold coins.

Upon the accession of the prince's mother as Elizabeth II on 6 February 1952, Prince Charles was automatically made the Duke of Cornwall. As such he is able to display the arms of the duchy on his coat of arms. This title has been granted to every heir apparent since 17 March 1337, in accordance with a charter issued by Edward III for his eldest son and heir Edward of Woodstock. A royal warrant of 21 June 1968 augmented this arms with two supporters "on either side, a Cornish chough proper supporting an ostrich feather Argent, penned Or", and a motto: "Houmont" (or Houmout), meaning courage.

Escutcheon

Independent Native Prince of Wales

English/British Heir Apparent

Family

Consorts
The family of the Prince of Wales is entitled to use certain heraldic features. The consort of the Prince of Wales (titled the Princess of Wales) is granted a unique coat of arms upon marriage, based on the impaling of the prince's arms (on the dexter side) and her father's arms (on the sinister side). The consort is also entitled to use the prince's supporters (with the appropriate label) and the use of the prince's coronet over the arms. The current consort, Catherine, the Princess of Wales, was granted a coat of arms upon her marriage to William, Prince of Wales in 2011 (at the time known as the Duke of Cambridge).

Other arms

See also

 Royal coat of arms of the United Kingdom
 Royal arms of Scotland
 Royal Badge of Wales
 Prince of Wales
 Duke of Rothesay
 Duke of Cornwall
 Coat of arms of the Prince of Asturias
 Cornish heraldry

References

Bibliography

Links
 Titles and Heraldry at the Official website of the Prince of Wales

Coat of arms
Coat of arms
Prince of Wales
Prince of Wales
English heraldry
National symbols of the United Kingdom
National symbols of England
National symbols of Wales
Prince of Wales
Prince of Wales
Prince of Wales
Prince of Wales
Prince of Wales
Prince of Wales